Viktor Zhurba (born 6 August 1950) is a retired male discus thrower. He represented the Soviet Union during his career in the late 1960s and early 1970s. Zhurba is best known for winning the gold medal in the men's discus event at the 1973 Summer Universiade in Moscow.

References
hem.bredband.net

1950 births
Living people
Russian male discus throwers
Soviet male discus throwers
Universiade medalists in athletics (track and field)
Universiade gold medalists for the Soviet Union
Medalists at the 1973 Summer Universiade